The Cincinnati–Memphis rivalry is a college sports rivalry between the University of Cincinnati Bearcats and the University of Memphis Tigers. The rivalry between these two schools dates to their first college football game in 1966, and has continued across all sports, with the men's basketball series gaining attention as well, having started in 1968. The schools have also shared conferences historically, with the rivalry stretching over the span of five conferences from the Missouri Valley Conference, to the Metro Conference, Great Midwest Conference, Conference USA, and more recently in the American Athletic Conference.

History

Both universities share histories in their founding as small city universities into large universities with prominent Division 1 athletic programs. The schools would first face off as members of the Missouri Valley Conference in the 1960s and then both schools would be founding members of the Metro Conference, Great Midwest Conference, and Conference USA. The schools were reunited as conference rivals due to the 2010–2014 NCAA conference realignment as members of the American Athletic Conference. While the rivalry was represented annually in football, the true intensity of the rivalry was felt more deeply on the basketball court.

Since the founding of the American, the schools have had many notable contests in various sports. Most recently, with the football teams facing off in the 2019 American Athletic Conference Football Championship Game, with Memphis claiming the victory.

Football

Notable games
Nov 24, 2001: Memphis was searching for their first winning season since 1994 and the story looked complete when the Tigers scored a touchdown with 2:16 left in the 4th quarter. However, Bearcats QB Gino Guidugli led a 75 yard drive, including a 36–yard catch on 4th and 27, that would end with the Bearcats scoring a touchdown with 4 seconds left to win 36–34.

September 24, 2015: In a primetime Thursday night match, Memphis QB Paxton Lynch and Cincinnati QB Hayden Moore led a 99 point shootout. Moore, replacing the injured Gunner Kiel during the first quarter, would set a Cincinnati record throwing for 557 yards. Despite surrendering the most yards in Memphis football history, the Tigers would win the game 53–46.

December 7, 2019: In what would be Mike Norvell's final game at Memphis, the No. 20 Bearcats and No. 17 Tigers clashed for the second consecutive week in the 2019 American Athletic Conference Football Championship Game. Bearcats QB Desmond Ridder returned from injury to start and the teams went blow for blow, with the game having 6 lead changes. However, the Tigers once again proved to be too much for the Bearcats and would win 29–24 to clinch an appearance in the 2019 Cotton Bowl Classic.

Game results
Rankings are from the AP Poll (1936–present), CFP Poll (2014–present)

Wins by location

Men's Basketball

The teams have faced off 84 times in basketball series history, with Cincinnati leading the all-time series 47-36 (and one win vacated by Memphis) as of the 2021-22 season.  The teams have played six times in conference tournaments with Cincinnati leading 5–1. Memphis and Cincinnati have faced off once in the NCAA tournament, with Cincinnati leading 1–0.

Notable games
March 29, 1992: In a rare coincidence, the Tigers and Bearcats faced off for the fourth time during the 1991–92 season, this time in the NCAA Elite Eight. Nick Van Exel and Cincinnati defeated Great Midwest Player of the Year Penny Hardaway in the two regular season matchups and in the tournament final hosted in Chicago. No. 12 Cincinnati would prove to be too much for the Tigers again in Kansas City beating the Tigers 88–57 before falling to the Michigan Fab Five in the Final Four.

February 6, 1993: After four defeats in the prior season, Memphis and Penny Hardaway were ready for blood when the Bearcats visited the Memphis Pyramid. The No. 4 Bearcats were defeated by the Tigers 68–66, recording Memphis their 1,000 program win and what would be Hardaway's only win as a player against Cincinnati.

March 1, 1997: The No. 9 Bearcats were defeated in Memphis 75–63, in what became famously Memphis coach Larry Finch's final game as he was forced to resign by University of Memphis administrators. He would leave as Memphis's winningest coach of all time.

Mar 3, 2002: Steve Logan and the No. 4 Bearcats came into their senior day game against the Tigers having won or shared each of Conference USA's six regular season titles, but the Tigers battled furiously to top Cincinnati. Cincinnati missed all 16 of their three-point attempts, with senior Logan having to take charge and tie the game with only 6.9 seconds left to send it to overtime. The Bearcats would prevail in the OT period 80–75.

Mar 1, 2003: The Bearcats entered the game holding a six-game winning streak at the expense of the Tigers. Memphis dominated the second half and led by 23 points from Chris Massie, Memphis won, 67-48, handing Cincinnati its worst defeat in eight years of Conference USA play.

Mar 6, 2004: No. 20 Memphis visited No. 13 Cincinnati having won 12 of their previous 13 games. In the regular season finale, Bearcat Tony Bobbitt would sink a critical three-pointer to give UC the lead with 36 seconds remaining. Cincinnati would win 83-79. 

Mar 5, 2005: It what would be Bob Huggins final game as against Memphis as Cincinnati's Head Coach, the No. 22 Bearcats won in a game with a bizarre ending. Mistakenly believing the Bearcats to have the lead, James White received the inbound and scored a lazy shot with only a few seconds remaining. That basket would prove to be the difference in beating John Calipari's Tigers 62–60.

January 4, 2014: In the first game of the two teams in the American Athletic Conference, the Bearcats came storming into FedExForum to take on the No. 18 Tigers. Cincinnati would topple Memphis 69–53. Both teams would advance to the 2014 NCAA Division I men's basketball tournament as the rivalry was rekindled in the new conference.

Game results
Rankings are from the AP Poll (1936–present)

Source

Notes

A 1987 Metro Conference men's basketball tournament
B 1992 Great Midwest Conference men's basketball tournament
C 1992 NCAA Elite Eight
D 1993 Great Midwest Conference men's basketball tournament
E 1994 Great Midwest Conference men's basketball tournament
F 1995 Great Midwest Conference men's basketball tournament
G 2018 American Athletic Conference men's basketball tournament

Wins by location

Wins by venue

Women's Basketball

First playing in the 1977–78 season, Memphis now leads the all-time series 36–24 as of the end of the 2020–21 season.

Baseball

The baseball teams have met a total of 137 times since 1962, with Memphis leading the series 67–50 as of the end of the 2021 season.

References

College basketball rivalries in the United States
College football rivalries in the United States
Cincinnati Bearcats basketball
Cincinnati Bearcats football
Memphis Tigers football